North Pocono High School is a public, four-year high school located in Covington Township, Lackawanna County, Pennsylvania. The school building was built in 2009. It is the only high school in the North Pocono School District, which covers a vast territory in northeastern Pennsylvania, including parts of Wayne County and all of southern and east-central Lackawanna County.

North Pocono has been ranked as one of America's Most Challenging High Schools by the Washington Post for two consecutive years  and one of America's Best High Schools by Newsweek. North Pocono is also one of two school districts nationwide to make the AP Honor Roll for six consecutive years.

The old high school, on Church Street in the borough of Moscow, is now the North Pocono Middle School and houses grades 6 through 8, with the new high school containing grades 9 through 12.

There are over 70 faculty members, which creates a teacher-student ratio of 1:15. Each grade consists of 220-280 students.

Accreditation

North Pocono High School is accredited by the Pennsylvania Department of Education and Middle States Association of Colleges and Secondary Schools.

Administration

 Daniel Powell : Superintendent of Schools
 Ian Farr: Assistant Superintendent 
 Ronald Collins: Principal
 Christopher Sload: Vice Principal
 Jamie McHugh: Vice Principal/Athletic Director

Academics

North Pocono High School offers six programs of study.

Academic: The academic program of study provides students with a well-rounded education. This course will prepare students for college or continuing their education.

Accelerated: The accelerated program of study is designed to position students to engage in challenging and enriching course content. The sequence of courses is designed puts students in classes a year in advance of the academic students in science and math. During the junior year, assignments and difficulty will focus on college readiness. During senior year, assignments and difficulty will focus on college level content.

Basic/General: The general program of study prepares students for integration into the 21st Century workforce or transition into some kind of post-secondary education or training.

Business: The business program combines the general or academic program of study with business electives.

Vocational: The vocational program of study offers students an opportunity to combine their general or academic program of study at North Pocono High School with one of sixteen vocational programs of study offered through the Career Technology Center of Lackawanna County.

Advanced Placement: The Advanced Placement (AP) Program offers college level courses and examinations to high school students. The underlying premise of the AP Program is that college level courses can be successfully taught to high school students by high school teachers on high school campuses. Advanced Placement courses make it possible for academically talented students to upgrade the quality and increase the challenge of their studies, both in high school and college. The Advanced Placement Program consists of courses identified by the College Board as college level in content. Upon successful completion of an AP course, it is strongly suggested that students take the corresponding AP exam to realize the full benefit of the course. Based on the score the student receives on a particular examination and the specific college or university that a student chooses to attend, college credit, advanced standing or course waiver may be offered to that student. Students enrolled in these courses will be expected to perform at a stringent level of competence and should anticipate a significant amount of additional work outside of class.

North Pocono High School offers the following Advanced Placement (AP) courses: 
 AP Art History 
 AP Biology 
 AP Calculus AB
 AP Calculus BC 
 AP Chemistry
 AP Computer Science Principles
 AP English Literature & Composition
 AP English Language & Composition
 AP Environmental Studies 
 AP Macroeconomics 
 AP Microeconomics 
 AP Music Theory
 AP Physics 1
 AP Physics 2 
 AP Psychology 
 AP Studio Art 2-D Design  
 AP Studio Art 3-D Design  
 AP Studio Art Drawing 
 AP Statistics 
 AP U.S. Government & Politics
 AP U. S. History 
 AP Spanish
 AP World History

Departments

The school is organized into the following departments:
 Art
 Business 
 English
 Family & Consumer Science
 Foreign Language
 Health and Physical Education
 Mathematics 
 Music 
 Science 
 Social Studies
 Technology
 Vocational

Graduation requirements
In order to graduate, a student must acquire a minimum of 21 credits in grades 9 through 12. These 21 credits must include the following:
 4 credits of English
 4 credits of Social Studies
 3 credits of Mathematics
 3 credits of Science
 1 credit of Health and Physical Education
 Balance of credits required: Electives

Grading

 A	96 to 100	
 A-	92 to 95
 B+	88 to 91
 B	84 to 87
 B-	81 to 83
 C+	78 to 80
 C	74 to 77
 C-	70 to 73
 D	65 to 69
 F	0  to 64

In order to reward and encourage students to take enriched course, a numerical multiplier will be used to calculate weighted GPA. The weighted GPA will determine class rank and honors graduate status. This is an incentive to reward students that take a more challenging course of study. Multipliers will not be reflected in any grades reported on report cards of transcripts.

 Advanced Placement Courses  x        1.10   =       110 total points possible        (4.40 Maximum Weighted GPA)
 Accelerated Courses         x        1.06   =       106 total points possible        (4.24 Maximum Weighted GPA)
 Academic Courses            x        1.02   =       102 total points possible        (4.08 Maximum Weighted GPA)
 General Courses             x        1.00   =       100 total points possible        (4.00 Maximum Weighted GPA)

Honor Roll status is determined at the end of each marking period, and will be based on a student's weighted GPA. High Honors will be based on a minimum weighted GPA of 3.80. Honors will be based on a minimum weighted GPA of 3.52. Students must maintain a minimum grade of 75% in minor courses. In addition, any grade below the following in any major course will disqualify a student from Honor Roll status:

 General              83%
 Academic             82%
 Accelerated          81%
 Advanced Placement   80%

Sports and Activities

North Pocono High School is home to the North Pocono Trojans, whose mascot is the trojan. The Trojans actively participate in the following sports:
 Boys' Baseball
 Boys' Basketball
 Coed Cheerleading (fall and winter)
 Coed Cross Country
 Boys' Football
 Gymnastics
 Coed Golf
 Boys' Lacrosse
 Girls' Lacrosse
 Girls' Soccer
 Girls' Softball
 Girls' Tennis
 Boys' Tennis
 Girls' Volleyball
 Boys' Volleyball
 Coed Track and Field
 Coed Rifle
 They also have one swimmer
North Pocono also offers the following activities:

 Art Club
 Debate Club
Dead Language Society
 Environmental Club
 Future Business Leaders of America (FBLA)
 Gay Straight Alliance (GSA)
 Interact Club
 Junior Academy of Science
 Mathletes Club
 Mock Trial Team
 National Honor Society (NHS)
 Prom Committee
 Reading Celebrations
 Red Cross Club
 Students Against Destructive Decisions (SADD)
 Science Olympiad
 Ski Club
 Student Council
 Trojan Voice Student Newspaper
 Yearbook Staff

North Pocono is well known for its talented faculty and students in the arts department. North Pocono High School offers the following performing and visual groups:
 Orchestra
 String Ensemble
 Chorus
 Show Choir
 A Capella Ensemble
 Steel Drum Band
 Jazz Ensemble
 Concert Band
 Trojan Marching Band
 Color Guard
 Majorettes
 Honor Guard
 Band Managers
 Drama Club

References

External links
North Pocono High School Official site
North Pocono School District Home Page

Public high schools in Pennsylvania
Schools in Lackawanna County, Pennsylvania
2009 establishments in Pennsylvania